Pi Hongyan (born 25 January 1979) is a former Chinese badminton player, who later represented France.

Career 
Pi Hongyan is one of a number of talented Chinese-born badminton players who have emigrated from China, in part, because of the intense competition to gain positions on its national team, and because of the elite status within the sport that such a player is likely to hold in other badminton playing countries.  Her titles include women's singles at the U.S. (1999), German (2001, 2002), Bitburger (2001, 2002), Portugal (2001, 2003), Swiss (2001, 2005), Croatian (2003), French (2003, 2004, 2005), Dutch (2004), Denmark (2005), Singapore (2006) and India (2009) Opens. At the biennial European Championships she was a silver medalist in 2004 and a bronze medalist in 2008 and 2010.  She was runner-up to China's Xie Xingfang at the prestigious All-England Championships in 2007. Pi has been at least a quarter-finalist in each of the last six consecutive BWF World Championships (2005, 2006, 2007, 2009, 2010, and  2011),  with a bronze medal in 2009, as well as a quarter-finalist at the 2008 Beijing Olympic Games.

Achievements

BWF World Championships 
Women's singles

European Championships 
Women's singles

Asian Junior Championships 
Girls' singles

BWF Superseries 
The BWF Superseries, which was launched on 14 December 2006 and implemented in 2007, was a series of elite badminton tournaments, sanctioned by the Badminton World Federation (BWF). BWF Superseries levels were Superseries and Superseries Premier. A season of Superseries consisted of twelve tournaments around the world that had been introduced since 2011. Successful players were invited to the Superseries Finals, which were held at the end of each year.

Women's singles

  BWF Superseries Finals tournament
  BWF Superseries Premier tournament
  BWF Superseries tournament

BWF Grand Prix 
The BWF Grand Prix had two levels, the Grand Prix and Grand Prix Gold. It was a series of badminton tournaments sanctioned by the Badminton World Federation (BWF) and played between 2007 and 2017. The World Badminton Grand Prix was sanctioned by the International Badminton Federation from 1983 to 2006.

Women's singles

 BWF Grand Prix Gold tournament
 BWF & IBF Grand Prix tournament

BWF International Challenge/Series 
Women's singles

Mixed doubles

  BWF International Challenge tournament
  BWF/IBF International Series tournament

Record against selected opponents 
Record against year-end Finals finalists, World Championships semi-finalists, and Olympic quarter-finalists.

References

External links 
 
 Official website of Pi Hongyan

1979 births
Living people
Badminton players from Chongqing
Chinese female badminton players
French female badminton players
Chinese emigrants to France
Naturalized citizens of France
People who lost Chinese citizenship
Badminton players at the 2004 Summer Olympics
Badminton players at the 2008 Summer Olympics
Badminton players at the 2012 Summer Olympics
Olympic badminton players of France